Roberto Elvira (born 9 May 1963) is a Spanish retired footballer who played as a forward and manager.

Playing career
Roberto Elvira started his professional career in 1981 with Sabadell and he played in different clubs as striker in first and second division league in spain. He made his first team debut with Sabadell at the age of 18, in the Spanish Segunda División , coached by Manuel Polinario Muñoz. Regularly engaged, he scores 10 goals in the league, made in the last 12 days. In the following season he is still the holder in attack, together with Antonio Zambrano Díaz and Hans Schönhöfer. He scores 9 goals in 38 games, but his contribution is not enough to avoid relegation to Segunda B.

Thus Roberto passes to Real Zaragoza . In his first season in blue-white he is mainly engaged with Deportivo Aragón , the Zaragoza branch team that is playing his first and only season in Segunda División. He is the best scorer of the team with 16 goals, but once again the season ends with the relegation to Segunda B. In parallel, he is also engaged in the first team: although not making his debut in the league, he plays 6 games in the La Liga Cup(in which the Aragonese are eliminated in the semifinal) and 4 in the Spanish Cup, a competition that is won by Real Zaragoza. In the next two seasons, he is definitely part of the first team. On August 31, 1986 he made his Primera División debut against Sevilla. In the 1986-1987 season he also took part in the Cup Winners' Cup : Real Zaragoza arrived in the semifinal where he was defeated by Ajax. Roberto plays both challenges against the Dutch.

In 1988 he moved to Osasuna . He made his debut on 4 September at Real Madrid . Subsequently, he returns to the Sabadell in Segunda División. In the 1992-1993 season he played in the Palamós in the Segunda División. He continues his career in Segunda División B, with the FC Andorra and CE l'Hospitalet andmakes his return to Sabadell, with whom he plays for two more seasons before retire.

In total, in his three spell with the club, he made more than 200 appearances with Sabadell.

Coaching  career
After retirement from playing he worked as manager for Sabadell and Hospitalet.

References

1963 births
Living people
People from Barcelona
Spanish footballers
Association football forwards
La Liga players
Segunda División B players
CE Sabadell FC footballers
Real Zaragoza players
CA Osasuna players